Castledaly is a village and electoral district in County Westmeath, Ireland. It is located on the R444 regional road 5 km southwest of the town of Moate and about 13km from Athlone.

Village 
Castledaly village consists of a church, community centre, pub, GAA pitch and walking track and a children's playground. Castledaly Manor, a nearby Georgian stately home built around 1780, is now used as a Christian Camp and Conference Centre. The local national (primary) school, Kilcleagh National School, had approximately 100 pupils enrolled as of 2020. The village has a Tidy Towns committee.

See also 
 List of towns and villages in Ireland

References 

Towns and villages in County Westmeath